The 2016–17 Israel State Cup (Gvia HaMedina) was the 78th season of Israel's nationwide Association football cup competition and the 63rd after the Israeli Declaration of Independence.

The competition commenced in September 2016, and the final was held on 25 May 2017.
The competition was won by Bnei Yehuda who had beaten Maccabi Tel Aviv on penalties after 0–0 in the final.

Preliminary rounds

First to fourth rounds
Rounds 1 to 4 double as cup competition for each division in Liga Bet and Liga Gimel. The two third-round winners from each Liga Bet division and the fourth-round winner from each Liga Gimel division advance to the sixth round.

Liga Bet

Liga Bet North A

1.From North B.

Liga Bet North B

Liga Bet South A

Liga Bet South B

Liga Gimel

Liga Gimel Upper Galilee

Liga Gimel Lower Galilee

Liga Gimel Jezreel

Liga Gimel Shomron

Liga Gimel Sharon

Liga Gimel Tel Aviv

Liga Gimel Center

Liga Gimel South

Fifth round
The fifth round is played within each division of Liga Alef. The winners qualify to the sixth round

Nationwide Rounds

Sixth round

Seventh round

Eighth round

Round of 16

Quarter-finals

|}

Semi-finals

Final

References

External links
 Israel Football Association website 

State Cup
Israel State Cup seasons